Annie Ackerman (1914 - March 1, 1989) was an American political activist. Known as the Condo Queen, she moved to Miami in 1969 from Chicago. In Florida, she became a prominent member of the Florida Democratic Party. She was inducted into the Florida Women's Hall of Fame.

Life 
She grew up in Chicago. In 1969, she and her husband, Irving, moved to North Miami Beach, Florida.

She led a condo association, and her endorsement was often sought by local politicians and presidential candidates. A 30-block stretch of Biscayne Boulevard was named after her, and Charles Whitehead said that Ackerman "wields more power than any other private citizen in Florida". She controlled 40,000 votes, and influenced thousands more. She was acquainted with Jimmy Carter, Walter Mondale, and Michael Dukakis, all of whom she endorsed for their presidential campaigns. In her early life, Ackerman worked for Richard J. Daley, and she often organized protests.

References

1989 deaths
American political activists
People from Chicago
People from Miami